David Downes may refer to:

 David Downes (sociologist) (born before 1966), British sociologist and criminologist
 David Downes (New Zealand composer) (born 1967), noted for dance-inspired music
 David Downes (Irish composer) (born 1975), co-founder and musical director of Celtic Woman

See also
Dave Downs (born 1952), baseball player
Downes (surname)